Shrine of Nuriya is the shrine of Ustad Nuriya, an Islamic saint. It is located in Uch in present-day Punjab, Pakistan. It is one of the five monuments in Uch Sharif, Pakistan which are on the tentative list of the UNESCO World Heritage Sites.

References

Mausoleums in Punjab, Pakistan
History of Punjab, Pakistan
Monuments and memorials in Punjab, Pakistan
Bahawalpur District